The Orquesta Clásica Santa Cecilia (literally, Santa Cecilia Classical Orchestra in English), founded in 2001, is an orchestra based in Madrid, Spain. The orchestra belongs to the Excelentia Foundation.

References

See also 
 Madrid Symphony Orchestra
 Spanish National Orchestra
 RTVE Symphony Orchestra

Spanish orchestras
Culture in Madrid